Auramine phenol stain is a stain used in clinical microbiology and histology to identify tuberculosis mycobacteria.

There are two types of auramine phenol stains, 1 and 2 to stain mycobacterium species and cryptosporidium respectively. Both are fluorescent stains. The bacteria or the parasites appear brilliant greenish yellow against dark background.
Mycolic acids of the mycobacteria keep this stain when decolorising with the acid alcohol. The method is more rapid and sensitive than ZN technique.

Method
 Smears are prepared just like that for ZN staining
 Stain with Auramine-Phenol for 20 mins
 Rinse with water
 Decolourise in acid alcohol
 Rinse with water
 Counterstain with 0.1% potassium permanganate for 30 seconds
 Rinse and air dry

References

Staining
Tuberculosis